Frederick Christopher Kwabena Gyearbuor Asante (4 November 1941 – 2 August 2000) was a Ghanaian actor best remembered for his role in the Channel 4 situation comedy Desmond's, in which he played the role of Gambian mature student Matthew.

Life and career 

Born in Accra, Asante moved to the United Kingdom in 1967 and trained to be an actor at the Mountview Academy of Theatre Arts. A "Gyearbuor Asante Prize for Acting" was subsequently instituted at the academy following his death. He appeared in a number of British TV shows during the 1970s and '80s, where he was billed as Christopher Asante. His credits included episodes of Space: 1999, Mind Your Language, Hazell and The Professionals as well as a TV performance of Ubu Roi in 1976. He also played the minister in the 1983 film Local Hero.

He came from a long line of chiefs of his hometown Kwahu Tafo but ruled himself out of carrying on the tradition in favour of pursuing a career in acting; the chieftaincy Asante was offered was taken up by his friend, television producer Humphrey Barclay.

He returned to his birthplace Ghana in 1995 where he was made a Cultural Ambassador. He died in the capital city of Accra with his funeral held in his ancestral village of Tafo Kwahu in the Eastern Region of Ghana.

Partial filmography 
The Strange Case of the End of Civilization as We Know It (1977) - African Delegate 
The Dogs of War (1980) - Geoffrey
Local Hero (1983) - Rev Macpherson

Desmond's (1989-1994) - Matthew

References

External links 

 
 Biography

1941 births
2000 deaths
Ghanaian male television actors
Alumni of the Mountview Academy of Theatre Arts
People from Accra
Ghanaian expatriates in the United Kingdom
Expatriate male actors in the United Kingdom
20th-century Ghanaian male actors